The Real Deal is an album by the American musician Smokey Wilson, released in 1995. Wilson supported the album with a North American tour.

The album was nominated for a W. C. Handy Award for best traditional blues album.

Production
The album was produced by Ron Levy. It includes covers of Eddie Taylor's "Bad Boy" and Muddy Waters's "Feel Like Going Home". Wilson wrote the remaining nine songs; he was primarily influenced by the styles of Mississippi blues musicians. Preston Shannon played rhythm guitar on The Real Deal.

Critical reception

The Chicago Tribune wrote that "Wilson brings a gruff, slashing Mississippi-bred attack to his uncompromising brand of contemporary blues." The Age stated: "Fronting a sturdy, rhythm section, Wilson brandishes a guitar that eases from West Coast panache to stinging, Mississippi Delta grit." 

The Anchorage Daily News determined that, "at their best, his songs achieve a slow, coruscating effect enlivened by bright, sparsely picked notes on his guitar." The Boston Herald opined that the album's acoustic tracks "positively reek of the Mississippi juke joints in which the Los Angeles-based Wilson learned his trade from the masters."

AllMusic deemed the album "electric juke-joint nirvana." MusicHound Blues: The Essential Album Guide praised the "joyous, defiant" "Not Pickin' Your Cotton".

Track listing

References

1995 albums
Blues albums by American artists